Luaras is a village in the Korçë County, southeastern Albania. At the 2015 local government reform it became part of the municipality Kolonjë.

Notable people
Kristo Luarasi, Albanian rilindas and first editor of the Kalendari Kombëtar magazine started in 1897 in Sofia, Bulgaria
Petro Nini Luarasi, writer, priest and Albanian Rilindas
Skënder Luarasi, scholar and anti-fascist

References

Populated places in Kolonjë, Korçë
Villages in Korçë County